Songs of the West may refer to:
Songs of the West (Burl Ives album)
Songs of the West (Emmylou Harris album)